Margracia Loudon (c. 1788 – 1860) was an Irish novelist and political author.   

Margracia Ryves was born around 1788 at Castle Ryves, County Limerick, Ireland.  She was the daughter of William Ryves, a landowner, and his wife, Frances Catherine Ryves, author of Cumbrian Legends; or, Tales of Other Times (1812).  In 1830, she married Charles Loudon, a physician, and they settled in Leamington Spa, Warwickshire, England.

Initially she was a popular novelist, then turned to political writing.  Her Philanthropic Economy became famous for its opposition to the Corn Laws.  Her next work, The Light of Mental Science (1845), was influenced by phrenology.  Her final non-fiction work, The Voices of Bulgaria (1946), focused on the plight of Christians in Ottoman-occupied Bulgaria and featured her own translations from Bulgarian.    

She died in Cheltenham, Gloucestershire, England in 1860.

Bibliography

Novels 

 First Love: A Novel (1830)
 Fortune-Hunting: A Novel (1832)
 Dilemmas of Pride (1833)
 The Fortunes of Woman (1849)
 Maternal Love: A Novel.  3 vol.  London: T. C. Newby, 1849.

Other works 

 Philanthropic Economy, or the Philosophy of Happiness, Practically Applied to the Social, Political, and Commercial Relations of Great Britain (1835)
 Corn Laws: Selections from Mrs Loudon's Philanthropic Economy (1842)
 The Light of Mental Science (1845)
 The Voices of Bulgaria (1846)

References 

Created via preloaddraft
1780s births
1860 deaths

Year of birth uncertain
Irish women writers